The 1986 Cornell Big Red football team was an American football team that represented Cornell University during the 1986 NCAA Division I-AA football season. Cornell finished second in the Ivy League. 

In its fourth season under head coach Maxie Baughan, the team compiled an 8–2 record and outscored opponents 202 to 103. Team captains were Tom Bernardo, Erik Bernstein and Ken Johnson. 

Cornell's 6–1 conference record placed second in the Ivy League standings. The Big Red outscored Ivy opponents 153 to 55. Cornell's only league loss was to the league champion, Penn, in a title-deciding game on the last week of the season.

Cornell played its home games at Schoellkopf Field in Ithaca, New York.

Schedule

References

Cornell
Cornell Big Red football seasons
Cornell Big Red football